Regula is both a surname and a given name. Notable people with the name include:

People with the surname
Alec Regula (born 2000), American ice hockey player
Lauren Bay Regula (born 1981), Canadian softball player
Paulo Regula (born 1989), Portuguese footballer
Ralph Regula (1924-2017), American politician
Robert Regula, American politician

People with the given name
Regula Mühlemann (born 1986), Swiss opera singer
Regula Rytz (born 1962), Swiss sociologist, historian and politician
Regula Tschumi, Swiss social anthropologist and art historian

See also
Felix and Regula, saints